Lewis Kenneth Dark (born 10 April 1989) is an English semi-professional footballer who is manager of Grays Athletic. A central midfielder or defender as a player, Dark began his career at Brentford, for whom he made appearances in the Football League, before dropping into non-League football upon his release in 2008. He entered management with Grays Athletic in 2022.

Playing career

Brentford 
Dark began his career in the academy at Premier League club Tottenham Hotspur, before joining the Centre of Excellence at League One club Brentford during the 2005 off-season. Towards the end of a disastrous 2006–07 season in League One, manager Scott Fitzgerald left the club after a 3–0 defeat to Crewe Alexandra on 9 April 2007 confirmed the club's relegation to League Two. Head of Youth Barry Quin took over as caretaker manager until the end of the season and named Dark in his first squad for a match versus Doncaster Rovers on 21 April. Dark made his professional debut when he came on for Charlie Ide after 80 minutes of the 3–0 defeat. He made a total of three appearances during the 2006–07 season.

In June 2007, it was announced that Dark had signed a one-year professional contract with Brentford, with the option for a further year. Under new manager Terry Butcher for the 2007–08 season, Dark found himself out of favour and failed to receive a call into the first team squad during the first half of the campaign. He joined Southern League First Division South & West club Farnborough on a one-month loan on 26 October 2007. Butcher was replaced by his assistant manager Andy Scott in December 2007 and called Dark into the first team squad for a league match versus Dagenham & Redbridge on 1 January 2008. He remained an unused substitute during the 2–1 victory. It was Dark's only involvement in the first team during the 2007–08 season and he moved to Isthmian League Premier Division club Ramsgate on a one-month loan on 1 February 2008. He made two appearances before returning to Brentford when his loan expired. Dark was released by Brentford at the end of the 2007-08 season.

Wivenhoe Town 
Dark signed for Eastern Counties League Premier Division club Wivenhoe Town in September 2008. He only made a single appearance for the club, which came in a 2–1 defeat to Mildenhall Town on 27 September. His stay with the Dragons was brief and he departed the club on 3 October.

Crawley Town 
Dark joined Conference Premier club Crawley Town on 3 October 2008. He made his debut as an injury time substitute for goalscorer Glenn Wilson in a 4–0 win over Barrow eight days later. It proved to be his only appearance for the Red Devils.

Fisher Athletic London 
Dark dropped to the Conference South to club for Fisher Athletic London in November 2008 and made five appearances for the club.

Grays Athletic 
Dark joined Conference Premier club Grays Athletic on non-contract terms in February 2009. He failed to make an appearance for the club and spent a period out injured.

Stansted 
Dark moved to Essex Senior League club Stansted in August 2009. He won the first silverware of his career during the 2009–10 season, with the Blues winning the division title. Dark signed a new deal with the club during the 2010 off-season. Though Stansted finished runners up to Enfield 1893 in the league (after having three points deducted for fielding an ineligible player), the Blues won the Essex Senior League Challenge Cup by defeating the new champions 3–0 in the final. Dark left the club at the end of the 2010–11 season.

Redbridge 
Dark joined Isthmian League First Division North club Redbridge on 27 May 2011. He made his competitive debut for the club against AFC Sudbury on 20 August 2011 and scored the Motormen's first goal in a 2–2 draw. Dark made 34 appearances and four goals before departing at the end of the 2011–12 season.

Maldon & Tiptree 
Dark signed for Isthmian League First Division North club Maldon & Tiptree during the 2012 off-season. He was a virtual ever-present during the 2012–13 season, a campaign which saw the Blues finish second in the league and lose to Thamesmead Town in the playoff final. Dark made 28 appearances during the 2013–14 season, a campaign in which the Jammers finished out of the playoffs. In June 2014, Dark signed for a third season at the Wallace Binder Ground, but after making five early-season appearances, he departed the club in mid-September 2014.

Return to Grays Athletic 
Dark re-signed for Isthmian League Premier Division club Grays Athletic in mid-September 2014. He made eight appearances before departing in January 2015.

Witham Town 
Dark signed for Isthmian League Premier Division strugglers Witham Town in January 2015. He made 22 appearances in Town's unsuccessful attempt at retaining their Premier Division status and left at the end of the 2014–15 season.

VCD Athletic and Thamesmead Town 
In May 2015, Dark joined Isthmian League Premier Division club VCD Athletic. He left the club before the beginning of the 2015–16 season and instead began the campaign with Isthmian League First Division North club Thamesmead Town. He remained at Bayliss Avenue until February 2016.

Heybridge Swifts 
In late February 2016, Dark signed for Isthmian League First Division North club Heybridge Swifts. During the remainder of the 2015–16 season, he made eight appearances and was a part of the team which lost 1–0 to Concord Rangers in the 2016 Essex Senior Cup Final. During the 2017 off-season, Dark was announced as the new club captain and remained a regular in the team until he lost his place in February 2018, due to a foot injury. After making 101 appearances for the club, Dark's contract was terminated by mutual consent in April 2018.

Bishop's Stortford 
On 8 June 2018, it was announced that Dark had joined Isthmian League Premier Division club Bishop's Stortford. He made 10 appearances and scored one goal before departing Woodside Park on 12 October 2018.

Return to Maldon & Tiptree 
In mid-October 2018, Dark returned to Isthmian League North Division club Maldon & Tiptree on a contract until the end of the 2018–19 season. He made 24 appearances and helped the club to the 2019 Isthmian League North Division play-off Final, in which the Jammers were defeated on penalties by Heybridge Swifts. Dark left the club at the end of the season.

Grays Athletic (third spell) 
On 4 June 2019, Dark returned to Isthmian League North Division club Grays Athletic for the third time and was announced as club captain. He made 41 appearances during the COVID-19-affected 2019–20 and 2020–21 seasons and 18 during 2021–22.

Managerial career 
On 25 April 2022, Dark was appointed manager of Isthmian League North Division club Grays Athletic.

Career statistics

Honours 
Stansted
 Essex Senior League: 2009–10
 Essex Senior League Challenge Cup: 2010–11

References

External links

English footballers
1989 births
Living people
Association football midfielders
Brentford F.C. players
Ramsgate F.C. players
Wivenhoe Town F.C. players
Crawley Town F.C. players
Grays Athletic F.C. players
Stansted F.C. players
Redbridge F.C. players
Farnborough F.C. players
Fisher Athletic F.C. players
Maldon & Tiptree F.C. players
English Football League players
National League (English football) players
Isthmian League players
Southern Football League players
Witham Town F.C. players
VCD Athletic F.C. players
Thamesmead Town F.C. players
Heybridge Swifts F.C. players
Bishop's Stortford F.C. players
Grays Athletic F.C. managers
Isthmian League managers